Harry Augustus George Daniels (25 June 1920 – 2002) was an English professional footballer who played as a half-back in the Football League for Queens Park Rangers, Brighton & Hove Albion and York City, and in non-League football for Kensington Sports and Dover.

References

1920 births
Footballers from Kensington
2002 deaths
English footballers
Association football midfielders
Queens Park Rangers F.C. players
Brighton & Hove Albion F.C. players
York City F.C. players
Dover F.C. players
English Football League players